philoSOPHIA: A Journal of Transcontinental Feminism (formerly subtitled A Journal of Continental Feminism) is an international, interdisciplinary, biannual peer-reviewed academic journal covering feminist theory and continental philosophy. Published by SUNY Press, the journal was established by philoSOPHIA: the Society for Continental Feminism, which was founded in 2008. The editors-in-chief are Alyson Cole and Kyoo Lee.

History
The journal is the product of philoSOPHIA: the Society for Continental Feminism, which was founded in Tennessee in 2008—initially as the French Feminism Circle—by Kelly Oliver (Vanderbilt University) and Stacy Keltner (Kennesaw State University). The journal was established in 2011, after the society's third annual conference. The founding co-editors were Elaine Miller and Emily Zakin (Miami University).

According to its founding editors, the society and journal were named after Sophia, the feminine aspect of God who fell from grace because of her love of knowledge. The name serves to illustrate that women who love philosophy are not necessarily in love with the patriarchy.

Since issue 9.1 (2019), the journal's cover image has been replaced, substituting the previous one with a photo collage by the artist Lorna Simpson, called Unanswerable.

Abstracting and indexing
The journal is abstracted and indexed in:

See also 
 List of philosophy journals
 List of women's studies journals

References

External links 
 
 PhiloSOPHIA: Society for Continental Feminism

Publications established in 2011
Biannual journals
English-language journals
Feminist journals
Feminist philosophy
Social philosophy journals
SUNY Press academic journals
Philosophy Documentation Center academic journals